Richard Popplewell LVO (18 October 1935 - 22 March 2016) was an English organist and composer who served at the Chapel Royal and St Michael's, Cornhill.

Works 
His music was published by Banks.

Choral 

 A vast cloud of love (words by Madeline Chase)
 I will lift up mine eyes (Psalm 121)
 Magnificat and Nunc Dimittis in D-flat
 O how amiable (Psalm 84)
 There is no rose (Medieval words)
 Two Final Amens

Organ 

 Elegy (in memory of Harold Darke)
 Puck's Shadow
 Triumphal March
 Organ Concerto 1
 Organ Concerto 2

References

1916–1966

1979–present

1935 births
21st-century British male musicians
21st-century organists
Academics of the Royal College of Music
Alumni of the Royal College of Music
British male organists
Cathedral organists
English classical organists
Lieutenants of the Royal Victorian Order
Living people
People educated at Clifton College
People from Halifax, West Yorkshire
Male classical organists